Jeffrey S. Vetter is a  Corporate Fellow of computer science and mathematics, and the founding group leader at the Future Technologies Group in the Computer Science and Mathematics Division of Oak Ridge National Laboratory.

Education
Vetter attended Georgia Tech where he obtained his Ph.D. in computer science.

Research
His current research interests include scientific workflow systems, cloud computing, resource management, with particular emphasis on scientific workflow system management.

Honors 
Vetter is a Fellow of the IEEE.

References 	

Living people
Fellow Members of the IEEE
Place of birth missing (living people)
Year of birth missing (living people)
Georgia Tech alumni
American computer scientists